Mária Čírová (born 20 November 1988) is Slovak singer. In 2008, she won the final, eight edition of the Coca-Cola Popstar contest in Slovakia.

Discography

Albums

Singles

Filmography

Awards

Major awards

Music polls
Slávik by FORZA, Slovakia

Notes
A  In 2009, Čírová won a subcategory of the poll as the Jumper of the Year.

References
General
 

Specific

External links 

 MariaCirova.sk (official website)
 

21st-century Slovak women singers
1988 births
Living people
Musicians from Trnava